Acanthurus mata is a marine tropical fish belonging to the family of the Acanthuridae or surgeonfishes. Its common names are elongate surgeonfish and blue-lined surgeonfish.

Description
It is a medium sized fish that can reach a maximum size of  length. The body has an oval shape and is compressed laterally. Like other surgeonfishes, Acanthurus mata swims with its pectoral fins. The caudal fin has a crescent shape. The mouth is small and pointed. 
Its body is streaked with horizontal bluish lines on a brown background color although over time it is able to change colour to become grey-blue overall. A longitudinal yellow stripe runs across the eye and splits in two lines extending anterior the eye. The superior lip is also yellow. The dorsal and anal fin are bluish with a yellow reflection, with the base of the latter underlined by a fine black line. A sharp erectile spine (comparable to a scalpel, thus the species name) at the base of the tail is a defensive weapon.

Distribution
This fish has a wide distribution in tropical waters going from the west part of the Indian Ocean to the archipelagos in the middle of Pacific Ocean, so it's widespread all over the Indo-Pacific. It is found from the Red Sea and Gulf of Oman, south to Natal, eastwards to Society and Marquesan Islands, northwards to southern Japan, southwards to New South Wales and New Caledonia. Juveniles occur as far south as Sydney (R. Myers pers. comm. 2010). It is reported from Western Australia (Allen and Swainston 1988), south to Shark Bay. It is not known to occur from the Hawaiian Islands, Pitcairn Islands and Rapa (Randall 2001a). In 2021, the species was recently recorded off the Galápagos Islands in the Tropical Eastern Pacific.

Habitat
Acanthurus mata inhabits usually steep slopes around coral reefs in depth range from 5 to 45m.

Feeding
Elongate surgeonfish is a planktivore with a preference for the zooplankton.

Behaviour
Acanthurus mata has a diurnal activity. It is solitary when resting on the reef but may form small aggregation in the open water during feeding.

References

External links
 

Acanthurus
Fish of Hawaii
Fish of Israel
Taxa named by Georges Cuvier
Fish described in 1829